The Nashville Bluegrass Band is an American bluegrass music ensemble founded in 1984.

The group's members first played together in 1984 as a backing band for Vernon Oxford and Minnie Pearl; each of the members was an established musician from the Nashville bluegrass community. They signed to Rounder Records and recorded their Béla Fleck-produced debut, My Native Home, in 1985. Incorporating elements of black gospel and spirituals, then a rarity in bluegrass, they became critical and popular successes both in America and abroad. The group toured in some 20 countries and were the first bluegrass band to ever play in China.

The group continued to record for Rounder and Sugar Hill into the 1990s; two of the albums, 1993's Waitin' for the Hard Times to Go and 1995's Unleashed, won Grammy Awards for Best Bluegrass Album. Other albums were nominated for Grammys in the same category in 1988, 1990, 1991, 1998, and 2004. After the departure of bassist Gene Libbea and mandolinist Roland White in 1998, the group went on a brief hiatus, but after vocalist Pat Enright sang as one of the Soggy Bottom Boys from O Brother, Where Art Thou?, the group's career had a revival. They played as the backing group for many performers on the Down from the Mountain tour and album, and toured again on their own in the 2000s.

Members
Current members
Alan O'Bryant - banjo, vocals
Pat Enright - guitar, vocals
Mike Compton - mandolin
Stuart Duncan - fiddle
Andy Todd - bass

Past members
Mark Hembree - bass
Gene Libbea - bass
Roland White - mandolin
Dennis Crouch - bass

Discography

References

External links
Official website

Musical groups from Nashville, Tennessee
American bluegrass music groups
Musical groups established in 1984